John Russell Cummings (born May 10, 1969) is an American former professional baseball left-handed pitcher from -. He attended Canyon High School in Anaheim, California.

The Los Angeles Dodgers traded him to the Detroit Tigers on July 31, 1996, with pitcher  Joey Eischen for outfielder Chad Curtis.

References

External links

1969 births
Living people
Albuquerque Dukes players
American expatriate baseball players in Canada
Appleton Foxes players
Baseball players from Torrance, California
Bellingham Mariners players
Buffalo Bisons (minor league) players
Calgary Cannons players
Detroit Tigers players
Jacksonville Suns players
Los Angeles Dodgers players
Major League Baseball pitchers
Pawtucket Red Sox players
Peninsula Pilots players
Riverside Pilots players
San Antonio Missions players
San Bernardino Spirit players
Seattle Mariners players
Tacoma Rainiers players
Toledo Mud Hens players
Tucson Sidewinders players
USC Trojans baseball players
Anchorage Glacier Pilots players